Breza is a town and municipality located in Zenica-Doboj Canton of the Federation of Bosnia and Herzegovina, an entity of Bosnia and Herzegovina. It is situated in central Bosnia and Herzegovina, and is famous for mining and production of coal.

History
Breza as a settlement was first time mentioned in documents dating from the 2nd century as Hedum Kastelum (Inhabited Castle). The ancient town was the capital of the infamous Daesitiates, an Ilyrian tribe which had most of the territory of modern central Bosnia under control before being crushed by the Romans.

Geography
According to the 2013 census, the municipality has a population of 14,168 inhabitants.

Education
The municipality has three primary schools and two secondary schools, one of which is a gymnasium and the other one is a technical/vocational school.

Sport
Breza is famous for having one of the oldest clubs formed in Bosnia and Herzegovina; the football club Rudar was formed in 1924. The town is also famous for many local volleyball and basketball clubs.

Villages in the municipality of Breza

Banjevac
Breza
Bukovik
Bulbušići
Gornja Breza
Izbod
Kamenice
Koritnik
Mahala
Mahmutovića Rijeka
Nasići
Očevlje
Orahovo
Podgora
Potkraj
Prhinje
Seoce
Slivno
Smailbegovići
Smrekovica
Sutješćica
Trtorići
Vardište
Vijesolići
Vlahinje
Vrbovik
Založje
Župča

Demographics

1971
In the 1971 census:

1991
In the 1991 census, the municipality of Breza had 17,317 residents:

2013
In the 2013 census, the municipality of Breza had 14,168 residents: 

In the 2013 census, the town of Breza had 3,014 residents:

Notable people
Haris Silajdžić, politician
Alija Sirotanović, miner
Obren Joksimović, Serbian politician and minister of health
Munib Bisić, politician

References

External links

Populated places in Breza, Bosnia and Herzegovina
Cities and towns in the Federation of Bosnia and Herzegovina
Municipalities of Zenica-Doboj Canton